Judith C. Toth (born October 21, 1937) is an American retired politician who served as a member of the Maryland House of Delegates from 1975 to 1990.

Early life and education 
Toth was born in Rochelle, Illinois in 1937. She attended an American high school in Sasebo, Japan before earning a Bachelor of Arts degree from Northwestern University in 1959. She later earned a Master of Public Health from the Johns Hopkins School of Public Health in 1989. Toth also took courses at Mexico City College, Georgetown University, the University of the Andes, Montgomery College, and the University of Maryland, College Park.

Career 
Prior to serving in the Maryland House of Delegates, Toth worked as an economist and businesswoman. She was elected to the House in 1974 and assumed office in 1975. During her tenure, Toth served as a member of the Environmental Matters Committee and Special Committee on Drug and Alcohol Abuse. In 1988, Toth announced that she would resign from the House at the end of her term, citing boredom with 90-day legislative sessions.

References 

1937 births
Living people
People from Rochelle, Illinois
Northwestern University alumni
Johns Hopkins Bloomberg School of Public Health alumni
Democratic Party members of the Maryland House of Delegates
People from Ogle County, Illinois
Women state legislators in Maryland
Mexico City College alumni
21st-century American women